Racovitza Islands is a group of three islands lying just north of Nansen Island, off the west coast of Graham Land. Surveyed by the Falkland Islands Dependencies Survey (FIDS) from the Racovitza, zoologist and botanist of the Belgian Antarctic Expedition which explored this area in 1897–99.

See also 
 List of Antarctic and sub-Antarctic islands

Islands of Graham Land
Danco Coast